Yousef Shadi (born 16 December 1969) is a Libyan cyclist. He competed in the men's individual road race at the 1996 Summer Olympics.

References

1969 births
Living people
Libyan male cyclists
Olympic cyclists of Libya
Cyclists at the 1996 Summer Olympics
Place of birth missing (living people)